Basava Puraskara is an award conferred by the Government of Karnataka. The award is presented on the basis of an individuals contribution for social reforms and social change and work for bringing about religious harmony.

The Award 

The Basava Puraskara is a national award. The award comprises Rs. 1 million, a memento and a citation.

Recipients

References 

Civil awards and decorations of Karnataka